Sewerynówka may refer to the following places:
Sewerynówka, Opole Lubelskie County in Lublin Voivodeship (east Poland)
Sewerynówka, Parczew County in Lublin Voivodeship (east Poland)
Sewerynówka, Masovian Voivodeship (east-central Poland)